The  Ministry of Defence of the Hashemite Kingdom of Jordan is the ministry in the Government of Jordan responsible for defence of Jordan. It is also involved with internal security.

Prime Minister Rashid Al-Madfai was the first to assume the position of Minister of Defense in Jordan in the government Tawfik Abu Al-Huda in 1939.

Following the king’s direction in August 2014, the government established the Ministry of Defense which assumed the political, economic, legal and logistic functions related to national defence. The ministry also took control of non-military logistic, administrative, investment and development duties. Furthermore, the General Command of the Jordan Armed Forces (JAF) handed over control of those duties not associated with specialized professional military services. The Ministry was also given the responsibility to regulate the relationship with retired military personnel and veterans.

References

Further reading

External links
 Ministry of Defence

 
Defence
Jordan
Military of Jordan
2004 establishments in Jordan